Justice is a 1993 German-language film directed by Hans W. Geißendörfer. It was an international co-production between Germany and Switzerland. Based on the 1985 novel The Execution of Justice by Friedrich Dürrenmatt, the film was chosen as Germany's official submission to the 66th Academy Awards for Best Foreign Language Film, but did not manage to receive a nomination.

Plot
Isaak Kohler (Maximilian Schell) coolly walked up to a man everyone assumed was his friend and shot him dead. This took place in front of dozens of witnesses in a busy restaurant, and there was no question about his guilt. What he never revealed was his motive. He has been in prison serving a twenty-year sentence ever since. Perhaps in order to ease his daughter's pain about the incident, he has hired a legal representative to arrange for him to receive a retrial. He is still unforthcoming about his reasons for committing the crime, and invites the struggling lawyer to make something up. This crime and courtroom drama is based on a novel by Friedrich Dürrenmatt, whose works are highly respected within the German-speaking intellectual community but whose appeal has proved difficult to translate.

Cast
 Maximilian Schell as Isaak Kohler
 Thomas Heinze as Felix Spat
 Anna Thalbach as Helene Kohler
 Mathias Gnädinger as Police Chief
 Norbert Schwientek as Stuessi-Leupin
 Ulrike Kriener as Ilse Freude
 Suzanne von Borsody as Daphne Winter
 Hark Bohm as Prof. Winter
 Carole Piguet as Monika Steigermann
 Diethelm Stix as Jaemmerlin
 Dietrich Siegl as Dr. Benno

See also
 List of submissions to the 66th Academy Awards for Best Foreign Language Film
 List of German submissions for the Academy Award for Best Foreign Language Film

References

External links

1993 films
1990s German-language films
1993 drama films
German drama films
Swiss drama films
Films based on Swiss novels
Films based on works by Friedrich Dürrenmatt
Films directed by Hans W. Geißendörfer
Films set in Switzerland
Films shot in Zürich
1990s German films